The Târgu Mureș metropolitan area is a metropolitan area in Târgu Mureș, Romania. It was founded in 2005. It has a population of 209,532 as of the 2011 census. It is Romania's only metropolitan area where Hungarians form the largest ethnic group, with 98,593 people. The Romanian population is 95,867. Other ethnicities include Romani, Germans, Italians, and Jews.

As defined by Eurostat, the Târgu Mureș functional urban area has a population of 180,922 residents.

Composition

References

External links
Zona Metropolitană Târgu Mureș

Târgu Mureș
Geography of Mureș County
Metropolitan areas of Romania